The 1881 Kentucky University football team represented Kentucky University (now known as Transylvania University) as an independent the 1881 college football season. The team compiled a record of 2–1.

Schedule

References

Kentucky University
Transylvania Pioneers football seasons
Kentucky University football